Shorgul is a 2016 Indian Hindi-language political thriller film, set against the backdrop of the 2013 Muzaffarnagar riots; it is directed by Pranav Kumar Singh (P. Singh) The film is produced by 24 FPS film Pvt Ltd. The film stars Jimmy Sheirgill, Suha Gezen, Ashutosh Rana, Narendra Jha, Anirudh Dave, Sanjay Suri, Hiten Tejwani and Eijaz Khan in lead roles.

The film was released on 1 July 2016. Upon release, the film received criticism and flopped.

Plot
In Maliabad, a small town in Uttar Pradesh, Chaudhary (Ashutosh Rana) is a local Jat politician. He is loved and respected by everyone for fighting for their cause. While on the opposite side Ranjit Om (Jimmy Sheirgill) is a new-generation MLA who wants to win the upcoming election at any cost. He is joined by an orthodox Maulana, who is banging doors to collect funds for a madrassa.

Chaudhary's son Raghu (Anirudh Dave) falls in love with a Muslim girl named Zainab (Suha Gezen) in college. Both love each other although Zainab is engaged to Saleem (Hiten Tejwani), a boy from her community. After threats from Saleem, Raghu starts evading her. Zainab forcefully invites Raghu to talk to her and their situation quickly escalates. Raghu is murdered with the help of Saleem, an act that sparks communal riots.

Ranjit and Maulana use the isolated incident to create havoc for their narrow gains and the escalating situation leads to Saleem also being killed. After a political deal with Ranjit, Maulana throws Zainab out of the community. It is followed with the murder of Chaudhary by the henchmen of Ranjit, who shield Zainab till his last breath. Ranjit wins the elections after the heavy bloodshed but his bonhomie with Maulana will cost his life. Political powerplays once again leads the way, as Zainab will get her share of revenge by eliminating Ranjit.

Cast
 Ashutosh Rana as Chaudhary
 Jimmy Sheirgill as Ranjit Om
 Anirudh Dave as Raghu, Chaudhary's son
 Suha Gezen as Zainab
 Narendra Jha as Alim Khan
 Shashie Verma as Shiva
 Hiten Tejwani as Saleem
 Sanjay Suri as Mithilesh Yadav
 Neetu Pandey as Savitri
 Eijaz Khan as Mustaqeem
 Hrishitaa Bhatt
 Jay Shanker Pandey as Anwar 
Mahesh Chandra Deva as Om's man
 Ahmad Khan in double role as minister and common man

Production
The shooting of the film started on 16 May 2015. Many scenes were shot in Lucknow.

The film has been slated to release on 24 June 2016. The scenes of Godhra and cow references have been muted in Shorgul by CBFC. Shorgul got U/A certificate from the censor Board. A scene of the film was leaked online before the release in which actor Narendra Jha is giving hate speech similar to that of Hyderabad MIM Leader Akbaruddin Owaisi's December 2012 Adilabad Speech. Former IT Minister Kapil Sibal has penned down the Lyrics of the songs "Tere bina" and "Mast hawa" for this film. Hrishitaa Bhatt has done a special song Mast Hawa in the film.

Soundtrack
Shorgul's Soundtrack Released In 13 June 2016 On Zee Music Company.

The First Song Of Album Is Tere Bina Sung By Arijit Singh, Jonita Gandhi, Awaaz Children's Choir, Which Was Composed By Niladri Kumar As The Guest Music Director And Song Written By Kapil Sibal.

The First Song Pulls Together For The First Time A Power Packed Combination That Marks Sitar/Zitar Maestro Niladri Kumar As Music Composer. Kapil Sibal Has Penned The Lyrics And The Soulful Inimitable Arijit Singh Will Be Heard In A Unique Style With The Song, That Will Leave Everyone Singing Along With An Unforgettable Tune That Will Remain Etched In Their Hearts.

What Makes This Most Special Is That This Song Marks The Debut Of A Choir Of Underprivileged Girls Who Have A Talent For Music. They Were Trained For 30 Days And Then Had A Chance to Sing On The Arijit Track. Awaaz, As We Call The In Their New Identity Have Crooned The Chorus Elements Of This Song. 

Except This Song, Whole Album Composed By Lalit Pandit. Sameer Anjaan, Kapil Sibal, Alok Rajan Jha Penned The Lyrics.

Release controversy
The scenes of Godhra and cow references have been muted in Shorgul by CBFC. Shorgul got U/A certificate from the censor Board. A PIL was filed by a VHP Leader in Allahabad High Court bench in Lucknow demanding to ban the release the film as many characters in the film are inspired from real politicians like character Ranjeet Om played by Jimmi Shergil in the movie is inspired by Sangeet Singh Som, Sanjay Suri's role of Mithilesh Yadav is based on Akhilesh Yadav, Narendra Jha's portrayal of Alim Khan is based on Azam Khan. CBFC snipped the words Godhra and Gau Ganga from the film. High Court rejected the PIL.

Another PIL for copyright violation was filed by Chandigarh-based author Vijay Soudai against the makers of the film. The makers claimed that Shorgul has been banned in Muzaffarnagar.
A fatwa was issued by Khamman Peer Baba Committee against Jimmy Shergill and the makers. Sangeet Singh Som demanded a ban on the film.

Critical reception
Nandini Ramnath of Scroll.in praised the individual performance in Shorgul. Mohar Basu of Times of India gave the film 2 out of 5 stars. Nabilah Hussain of Rediff.com gave the film 2 stars and stated that it failed to become a great film. Mid- Day gave the film 2 stars.

References

External links 
 
 
 

2016 films
2010s political thriller films
Indian political thriller films
Films set in India
Films based on the Mahabharata
2013 riots
Muzaffarnagar riots, 2013
History of Uttar Pradesh (1947–present)
Religiously motivated violence in India
Riots and civil disorder in India
Crime in Uttar Pradesh
Sexual violence at riots and crowd disturbances